Kleicha is a type of Middle Eastern cookie. It is sometimes considered to be the national cookie of Iraq, due to Assyrian influence of the country.

Kleicha comes in several traditional shapes and fillings. The most popular are the ones filled with dates (kleichat tamur). There are also sweet discs (khfefiyyat), as well as half moons filled with nuts, sugar and/or desiccated coconut (kleichat joz). They are usually flavoured with cardamom and sometimes rose water, and glazed with egg wash, which may sometimes be scented and coloured with saffron.

Saudi Arabia and Iraq people make kleicha for Eid al-Fitr and Eid al-Adha and also for their celebrations, weddings or special ceremonies and they are stuffed with many different fillings like dates, pistachios, walnuts, coconuts, dried figs, sesame seeds or Turkish delight.

Assyrians bake kilecheh on Eeda Gura, Easter, and Eeda Sura, Christmas, on which they are usually stuffed with dates and served with tea.

Etymology 
From Middle Persian [Book Pahlavi needed] (kwlʾck' /kulāčag/, “small, round bun”)

References

See also
Mesopotamian cuisine
Koloocheh
Kolompeh
Kulich
Ma'amoul
Saudi Arabian cuisine

Arab cuisine
Assyrian cuisine
Cookies
Iraqi cuisine
Middle Eastern cuisine
Saudi Arabian cuisine
National dishes
Turkish cuisine